Lynn Johnson may refer to:

Lynn Johnson (makeup artist), American makeup artist
Lynn Johnson (photographer), American photographer
Lynn A. Johnson, American government official
Lynn Johnson, British subject of the Up Series of documentaries
Lynn-Holly Johnson (born 1958), American ice skater and actress

See also
Lynn Johnston (disambiguation)
Linda Johnson (disambiguation)